Agonum chalconotum is a species of ground beetle in the Platyninae subfamily, that can be found in Great Britain, Latvia, Russia, and Near East. It is also can be found in Afghanistan, China, Turkey and all of the Central Asian republics (except for Azerbaijan).

References

Beetles described in 1832
Beetles of Asia
Beetles of Europe
chalconotum